Maja Beutler (8 December 1936 – 15 December 2021) was a Swiss writer.

Career 
She worked as a translator and for Stadttheater Bern and Schweizer Radio DRS, and wrote in German. Beutler died on 15 December 2021, at the age of 85.

Works 
Flissingen fehlt auf der Karte. Geschichten. Zytglogge, Gümligen 1976
Das Blaue Gesetz, Uraufführung 1979
Der Traum, Ballettlibretto, Uraufführung 1980
Fuss fassen. Roman. Zytglogge, Gümligen 1980
Die Wortfalle. Roman. Benziger, Zürich 1983
Das Marmelspiel, Uraufführung 1985
Das Bildnis der Doña Quichotte. Erzählungen. Nagel & Kimche, Zürich 1989
Lady Macbeth wäscht sich die Hände nicht mehr, Uraufführung 1994
Die Stunde, da wir fliegen lernen. Roman. Nagel & Kimche, Zürich 1994
Schwarzer Schnee. Erzählungen & Das Album der Signora. Zytglogge, Oberhofen 2009

Prizes 
Buchpreis der Stadt Bern (1976/1980/1984)
Preis der Schillerstiftung (1983)
Welti-Preis für das Drama (1985)
Literaturpreis der Stadt Bern (1988)

References

External links 
 
 
 
Linda M. Hess-Liechti: Das Gefängnis geht nebenan weiter... Studien zur mentalen Gefängnis- und Befreiungsthematik in Prosatexten von Margrit Baur, Maja Beutler und Margrit Schriber. Akademischer Verlag, Stuttgart 1996,
www.bibliomedia.ch

1936 births
2021 deaths
Writers from Bern
Swiss women writers
Swiss writers
Swiss writers in German